Muhammad Yusuf (born June 22, 1986) is an Indonesian footballer that currently plays for Deltras FC in the Indonesia Super League.

References

External links

1986 births
Association football midfielders
Living people
Indonesian footballers
Liga 1 (Indonesia) players
Deltras F.C. players
Persik Kediri players
Indonesian Premier Division players
PSIS Semarang players